Half United, also referred to as HU, is a socially conscious "give-back" brand that sells accessories and apparel. For every product sold, 7 meals are given to a child in need. It was founded by siblings Carmin and Christian Black in 2009, it has grown to become a well-recognized company whose main goal is fighting to end world hunger. Their main point of interest is the recycled bullet necklace, which symbolizes the fight to end hunger. Thousands of meals have been provided to people in countries like Cambodia, Madagascar, Fiji, and the United States of America. Half United has partnered with Toms Shoe Company, Pura Vida Bracelets, Nordstrom, Buckle, and other retailers across a global scale. The Blacks continue to keep their company a small organization by employing few staff and interns. Local to Wilmington, North Carolina, Half United products can be found in stores as well as the Half United Headquarters Wilmington location itself.

History 
Carmin and Christian Black started Half United in 2009 in Wilmington, North Carolina with two hundred dollars and an inspiration set by their parents and the ideals of Toms. With a pastor and fashion interior designer as parents, the siblings grew up with passion for giving and creativity. Carmin Black had a job at a local television station, WECT TV-6, when she decided she wanted to intern for TOMS. This sent her across the country to share the concept of the one-for-one business model. Carmin was inspired and able to bring back ideas on how to start a company based on the same model, due to the knowledge she gained through the internship.

Christian Black started a T-shirt company called 1989, but it was never a success. Grounded in the knowledge of trying to launch a business and the new one-for-one business model, the siblings set off to create an accessories company that would provide for those in need. When Half United first started, Carmin and Christian were not paid and did not make profit from the company. They gave the money made from products away as part of the business model. They kept working and since 2010, they have been able to provide over 500,000 meals to people in need. Profits go to international and local food organizations.

In July 2015, they launched at Forever21: a big win for the growing company.

Greater success would come in the fall of 2016, when they launched an exclusive line of jewelry with the popular retail chain, Buckle, that featured coins from each country where HU donates meals (USA, Fiji, Cambodia, and Haiti). In that same year, they were also featured on a segment of Good Morning America called "Deals and Steals," where their t-shirts and sweatshirts with the popular saying "Giving Back is the New Black" were highlighted.

Purpose 
The purpose of Half United is to fight hunger across the world by selling products and donating 7 meals for every product sold to feeding children in need. Carmin and Christian were inspired by a statistic stating, "925 million people worldwide suffer from hunger," which provided them with a mission to lower that number. They understood that hunger is the number one health risk worldwide leading to malnutrition, disease, and starvation. The Blacks wanted to put an end to the hunger crisis. The main item they use as the symbol of fighting hunger is recycled bullet casing necklaces. This symbol was chosen after a friend donated a box of spent casings to them in the early stages of product development. Then it clicked: the bullet represents their customer's fight against world hunger. Something that once could harm, can now only be used for good. These necklaces are sold all over the United States in small boutiques and larger department stores. HU sells other accessories such as T-shirts, hats, bracelets, and earrings with the same purpose of donating 7 meals for every product sold to children in need, both at home and abroad. Half United has inspired the community where the business is located to take a stand against the hunger crisis by providing to local food banks and by helping the economy of Wilmington, North Carolina. The accessories are all handmade. Supplies, such as the recycled bullet casings, are donated from resources around town. Seed necklaces are the next project on board for HU. They plan on planting one seed, for every necklace bought, in gardens globally.

Staff 
Half United staff includes a total of seven core members, alongside interns and unpaid volunteers:

 Carmin Black - founder alongside her brother; head of sales and senior designer for the company
 Christian Black - co-founder; the head of both the marketing and creative departments
 Hannah Black - involved with the sales department; assistant to co-founder, Carmin Black
 Anna Fortune - in charge of production and shipping for HU
 Natassja Simpson - marketing + creative team with Christian
 Meredith Wheeler - Vice President of Sales Development
 Olivia Prizzia - Director of Global Giving

The teams of interns and volunteers help to run HU smoothly.

Donations 
The cost of 7 meals is factored into the cost of every Half United product. At the end of every month, they divide the money evenly between their giving partners. The official meal count on the Half United website states they have provided over 650,000 meals as of May 2018. Some organizations they have donated to include the USA Food Bank of Central and Eastern North Carolina, Cape Fear Volunteer Center, Empowerment Advocates International of Cambodia and Madagascar, Papillion Enterprises in Haiti, the EAI Orphanage in Cambodia, and the Northern Christian Training Center Orphanage of Fiji. The money donated is used in many different ways. It is used for gardens, fish farms, education, and "backpack meals." The new project they have started will include planting a seed for each seed necklace purchased. They also work with the What If Foundation of Haiti and Vigilant of Hope in Wilmington. Helping in Wilmington, North Carolina helps build the sense of community and also shows how close to home the hunger problem is for the Black siblings.

Retailers 
HALF UNITED is sold online through their official website as well as in stores around the world, primarily in the United States and Canada. Retailers range from small
boutiques to large department stores. Nordstrom is one of their biggest
retailers as well as Buckle and Altar'd State. Because HU
was noticed at the Mercedes-Benz Fashion Week show, more orders were placed for
accessories. Retail stores are available in 28 different states
as well as online.  The
Half United headquarters can also be visited for purchasing products.

References

Clothing companies of the United States
Companies based in North Carolina
Companies based in Wilmington, North Carolina